Danish nationality law is governed by the Constitutional Act of the Realm of Denmark (of 1953) and the Consolidated Act of Danish Nationality (of 2003, with amendment in 2004).
Danish nationality can be acquired in one of the following ways:
 Automatically at birth if either parent is a Danish citizen, regardless of birthplace, if the child was born on or after 1 July 2014.
 Automatically if a person is adopted as a child under 12 years of age
 By declaration for nationals of another Nordic country
 By naturalisation, that is, by statute

In December 2018, the law on Danish citizenship was changed so that a handshake was mandatory during the ceremony. The regulation was made in an attempt to target members of the Islamist group Hizb ut-Tahrir from receiving Danish citizenship, since many of them refuse to shake hands with individuals of the opposite sex.

Loss of Danish Nationality
 Automatically at age 22 if a person acquired Danish nationality by birth, but was not born in the Kingdom of Denmark unless:
 this would render the person stateless 
 the person has lived in Finland, Iceland, Norway or Sweden for an aggregate period of no less than 7 years
 the person stayed in Denmark continuously for 3 months while registered on the Det Centrale Personregister
 the person visited Denmark for a total length of approximately 1 year under circumstances indicating some association with Denmark and the person has a working knowledge of the Danish language
 an individual review of effects in relation to EU law of a loss of EU citizenship as a result of losing Danish nationality outweighs the reasons to remove Danish nationality 
 By court order if a person acquired his or her Danish nationality by fraudulent conduct, for example a sham marriage
 By court order if a person is convicted of violation of one or more provisions of Parts 12 and 13 of the Danish Criminal Code (crimes against national security), unless this would render the person stateless
 By voluntary application to the Minister for Refugee, Immigration and Integration Affairs (a person who is or who desires to become a national of a foreign country may be released from his or her Danish nationality by such an application)

Naturalisation as a Danish citizen
 One must have permanent residence status in the Kingdom of Denmark in order to become a citizen.
 9 years of continuous residence, with restricted allowance for an interrupted residence of up to 1 year or 2 years in special circumstances (education, family illness). Continuous residence is not clearly defined, but one must state periods of absence from the Kingdom of Denmark longer than 4 consecutive weeks .
 8 years of continuous residence for people who are stateless or with refugee status
 Each year of marriage to a Danish citizen reduces the requirement by one year, to a maximum reduction of 3 years. Therefore, a minimum of 6 years of continuous uninterrupted residence is required for people who have been married to Danish nationals for 3 years.
 There is a special and little mentioned clause which allows for absences from the Kingdom of Denmark of longer than 1 or 2 years if one is married to a Danish citizen. The total period of continuous residence should be at least 3 years and it must exceed the total periods of absence, AND either: the period of marriage being at least 2 years or the total period of residence in the Kingdom of Denmark being 10 years less the period of marriage and the 1 year the applicant and Danish spouse have lived together before marriage). One must still have permanent residence.
 If one is married to a Dane working 'for Danish interests' in a foreign country, then this period of absence from the Kingdom of Denmark can count as duration of residence in the Kingdom of Denmark.

According to Statistics Denmark, 3,267 foreigners living in Denmark replaced their foreign citizenship with Danish citizenship in 2012. A total of 71.4% of all those who were naturalized in 2012 were from the non-Western world. Half of all new Danish citizenships in 2012 were given to people from Iraq, Afghanistan, Turkey, Somalia and Iran.

Crime 
Immigrants who have committed crimes may be denied Danish citizenship. For instance, immigrants who have received a prison sentence of one year or more, or at least three months for crimes against a person cannot receive citizenship. Convictions which have resulted in a fine also carries with it a time period for immigrants, where citizenship applications are rejected up to 4.5 years after the fine. Upon several offences, the period is extended by 3 years.

In April 2021, the Mette Frederiksen Cabinet approved regulation which stops awarding citizenship to foreigners who had received a prison sentence in court which also encompassed suspended prison sentences. Previously, awarding citizenship was possible for foreigners with a prison sentence of less than a year.

Dual citizenship
In October 2011, the newly elected centre-left coalition government indicated its intention to permit dual citizenship.

On 18 December 2014, Parliament passed a bill to allow Danish citizens to become foreign nationals without losing their Danish citizenship, and to allow foreign nationals to acquire Danish citizenship without renouncing their prior citizenship. A provision in the bill also allows former Danish nationals who lost their citizenship as a result of accepting another to reobtain Danish citizenship. This provision expired in 2020. A separate provision, lasting until 2017, allows current applicants for Danish citizenship who have been approved under the condition they renounce their prior citizenship to retain their prior nationality as they become Danish citizens. The law came into force on 1 September 2015.

Anyone with Danish (or other) citizenship may be required by a country of which they are also citizens to give up their other (Danish) citizenship, although this cannot be enforced outside the jurisdiction of the country in question. For example Japan does not permit multiple citizenship, while Argentina has no restrictions.

EU Citizenship
In 1992 Danish voters rejected the Maastricht Treaty. In 1993 Danish voters approved the four opt-outs as stipulated in the Edinburgh agreement including the opt-out for citizenship of the European Union.

Denmark
Danish citizens residing in Denmark proper are also citizens of the European Union under European Union law and thus enjoy rights of free movement and have the right to vote in elections for the European Parliament. When in a non-EU country where there is no Danish embassy, Danish citizens have the right to get consular protection from the embassy of any other EU country present in that country. Danish citizens can live and work in any country within the EU as a result of the right of free movement and residence granted in Article 21 of the EU Treaty.

Greenland

Greenland joined the European Economic Community along with Denmark proper in 1973 but left in 1985. Although Greenland is not part of the European Union, but remains associated with the EU through its OCT-status. Since Greenlanders hold Danish citizenship they enjoy the same rights as other Danish citizens regarding freedom of movement in the EU. This allows Greenlanders to move and reside freely within the EU.

Faroe Islands

The Faroe Islands have never been part of the EU or its predecessors, and EU treaties do not apply to the islands. Consequently, Danish citizens residing in the Faroe Islands are not EU citizens within the meaning of the treaties. However, they can choose between a non-EU Danish-Faroese passport (which is green and modelled on pre-EU Danish passport) or a regular Danish EU passport. Some EU member states may treat Danish citizens residing in the Faroe Islands the same as other Danish citizens and thus as EU citizens.

Concerning citizenship of the European Union as established in the Maastricht Treaty, Denmark proper obtained an opt-out in the Edinburgh Agreement, in which EU citizenship does not replace national citizenship and each member state is free to determine its nationals according to its own nationality law. The Amsterdam Treaty extends this to all EU member states, which renders the Danish opt-out de facto meaningless.

Travel freedom of Danish citizens

Visa requirements for Danish citizens are administrative entry restrictions by the authorities of other states placed on citizens of the Kingdom of Denmark. In May 2018, Danish citizens had visa-free or visa-on-arrival access to 185 countries and territories, ranking the Danish passport 5th in the world according to the Henley visa restrictions index.

The Danish nationality is ranked fourth in The Quality of Nationality Index (QNI). This index differs from the Henley Passport Index, which focuses on external factors including travel freedom. The QNI considers, besides travel freedom, internal factors such as peace & stability, economic strength, and human development as well.

See also
 Immigration to Denmark
 Citizenship in the Danish West Indies

Reference

External links
Danish Immigration service
 Circular letter No. 61 on Naturalisation, 22 September 2008 

Nationality law
Danish nationality law
Denmark and the European Union